Hypospila is a genus of moths in the family Erebidae. The genus was erected by Achille Guenée in 1852.

Species
 Hypospila bolinoides Guenée, 1852
 Hypospila brunnescens (Roepke, 1938)
 Hypospila contortalis (Mabille, 1880)
 Hypospila dochmotoma Turner, 1939
 Hypospila elongata Holloway, 1979
 Hypospila infimoides Moschler, 1880
 Hypospila iridicolor Pagenstecher, 1884
 Hypospila laurentensis Viette, 1966
 Hypospila ochracea Holloway, 1979
 Hypospila pseudobolinoides Holloway, 1979
 Hypospila similis Tams, 1935
 Hypospila tamsi Viette, 1951
 Hypospila thermesina Guenée, 1862
 Hypospila trimacula Saalmuller, 1891

Former species
 Hypospila creberrima (Walker, 1858)

References

 
Acantholipini
Moth genera